Helen Gregg was an American screenwriter active in the late 1920s. She was primarily responsible for writing intertitles on Westerns.

Selected filmography 

 Pals of the Prairie (1929) 
 The Pride of Pawnee (1929) 
 Laughing at Death (1929) 
 Idaho Red (1929) 
 The Vagabond Cub (1929)
 The Amazing Vagabond (1929) 
 Gun Law (1929) 
 The One Man Dog (1929) 
 Outlawed (1929) 
 Trail of the Horse Thieves (1929)
 Orphan of the Sage (1928)
 Stolen Love (1928)
 King Cowboy (1928)
 Rough Ridin' Red (1928)
 Tracked (1928)
 Young Whirlwind (1928) 
 Dog Law (1928) 
 Terror Mountain (1928) 
 Trail of Courage (1928)

References 

American women screenwriters
Year of birth missing
Year of death missing